The following is a list of the 19 cantons of the Aude department, in France, following the French canton reorganisation which came into effect in March 2015:

 Les Basses Plaines de l'Aude
 Le Bassin chaurien
 Carcassonne-1
 Carcassonne-2
 Carcassonne-3
 Les Corbières
 Les Corbières Méditerranée
 La Haute-Vallée de l'Aude
 Le Haut-Minervois
 Le Lézignanais
 La Malepère à la Montagne Noire
 La Montagne d'Alaric
 Narbonne-1
 Narbonne-2
 Narbonne-3
 La Piège au Razès
 La Région Limouxine
 Le Sud-Minervois
 La Vallée de l'Orbiel

References